The Elisabeth Luce Moore Library, donated by the Henry Luce Foundation, was named after Mrs. Elisabeth Luce Moore. It is located in the Chung Chi College of the Chinese University of Hong Kong. Resources found in the Elisabeth Luce Moore Library range from recognized music and religion collections to specialized works. Facilities include Late Reading Rooms and Group Study Rooms.

Background 
Of the seven libraries in the Chinese University of Hong Kong (CUHK), the Chung Chi Library was first built in 1951 with its home at St. John’s Cathedral Library. In 1956, it moved to the Ma Liu Shui campus. With a donation through the Henry Luce Foundation in the United States of America, the present library was named after Elisabeth Luce Moore and moved the last time to the Chung Chi College campus in 1971.

Resources 
Collections in the Elisabeth Luce Moore Library are especially specialized out of all university libraries found in CUHK. Other than recognized music and religion collections, there are also collections of Western literature and languages, Japanese literature and language, philology and linguistics, education and sports science. All collected works are supported by the Departments of Music, Religion, English, Modern Languages and Intercultural Studies, Japanese Studies and Faculty of Education in the Chinese University of Hong Kong.

In addition, the Library provides resources like theses, newspaper, together with ERIC documents and out-of-print materials on Music and Religion. To be specialized in education, Instructional Materials Collections, which is the collection of teaching materials for all secondary and primary schools' subjects of Hong Kong, can also be found in the Elisabeth Luce Moore Library.

Moreover, electronic resources can be accessed by CUHK students and staff too. These resources include the materials of Education, Humanities, Language & Literature, Music, Religion and Sport Sciences.

External links 

Chinese University of Hong Kong
Chung Chi College
Elisabeth Luce Moore Library

Academic libraries in Hong Kong
Chinese University of Hong Kong
Libraries established in 1951
Library buildings completed in 1971